Juan Alfonso Fuentes Soria (born 16 May 1947) is a politician who was Vice President of Guatemala following the appointment of Alejandro Maldonado as president by the Congress of Guatemala. He is also a dentist who was rector of the Universidad de San Carlos de Guatemala.

References

Living people
1947 births
Vice presidents of Guatemala
Guatemalan politicians
20th-century Guatemalan judges
Guatemalan diplomats
Universidad de San Carlos de Guatemala alumni
Presidents of Central American Parliament